Marko Jović (born 23 April 1998) is a Serbian football forward who plays for Javor Ivanjica.

Club career

Rad
Born in Sremska Mitrovica, Jović started his career with football club Rad, where he passed youth categories and signed a scholarship contract in summer 2014. He joined the first team for the 2015–16 season, but also stayed with youth team the whole season. In summer 2016, Jović extended his scholarship contract for three years. He made his official debut for the first team of FK Rad in 15 fixture match of the 2016–17 Serbian SuperLiga season, replacing Marko Stanojević in 89 minute of the match against Metalac Gornji Milanovac.

Sinđelić Beograd
On 8 February 2019, Jović joined FK Sinđelić Beograd.

Career statistics

Club

References

External links
 

1998 births
Living people
Sportspeople from Sremska Mitrovica
Serbian footballers
Association football forwards
FK Rad players
FK Sinđelić Beograd players
FK BSK Borča players
FK Javor Ivanjica players
Serbian SuperLiga players
Serbian First League players